Ministry of Education, abbreviated as MoE, is the ministry responsible for secondary, vocational and tertiary education in Bangladesh. Primary education and mass literacy is the responsibility of the Ministry of Primary and Mass Education (MOPME).
The Ministry of Education contains two divisions:
 Secondary and Higher Education Division
 Technical and Madrasah Education Division

Ministers 
 Current Minister: Dr.Dipu Moni
 Current Deputy minister of Technical and Madrasah Education Division: Mohibul Hasan Chowdhury

Departments

Secondary and Higher Education Division

 University Grants Commission of Bangladesh
 Bangladesh Accreditation Council
 Directorate of Secondary and Higher Education
 National Academy for Educational Management (NAEM)
 Education Engineering Department
 Bangladesh Bureau of Educational Information and Statistics (BANBEIS)
 Department of Inspection and Audit
 National Curriculum and Textbook Board (NCTB)
 Non-Government Teachers' Registration and Certification Authority (NTRCA)
 Bangladesh National Commission of UNESCO (BNCU)
 Prime Minister's Education Assistance Trust
 International Mother Language Institute
 Non-Government Teacher Employee Retirement Benefit Board
 Non-government Teachers and Employees Welfare Trust
 Board of Intermediate and Secondary Education, Dhaka
 Board of Intermediate and Secondary Education, Cumilla
 Board of Intermediate and Secondary Education, Dinajpur
 Board of Intermediate and Secondary Education, Rajshahi
 Board of Intermediate and Secondary Education, Barisal
 Board of Intermediate and Secondary Education, Chattogram
 Board of Intermediate and Secondary Education, Sylhet
 Board of Intermediate and Secondary Education, Jashore
 Board of Intermediate and Secondary Education, Mymensingh
 Bangladesh Scouts

Technical and Madrasah Education Division

 Directorate of Technical Education
 Directorate of Madrasha Education
 Bangladesh Madrasah Teachers' Training Institute (BMTTI)
 Bangladesh Technical Education Board
 National Computer Training and Research Academy (NACTAR)
 Bangladesh Madrasah Education Board

See also 

 Non-government Teachers and Employees Welfare Trust
 Minister of Finance (Bangladesh)

References

External links 
 

 
Education in Bangladesh
Bangladesh
Education